Boggia is an Italian surname. Notable people with the surname include:

Antonio Boggia (1799–1862), Italian serial killer
Jim Boggia, American singer-songwriter

See also
 Bogia (disambiguation)

Italian-language surnames